The S17 district lies within in the City of Sheffield, South Yorkshire, England.  The district contains 39 listed buildings that are recorded in the National Heritage List for England.  All the listed buildings are designated at Grade II, the lowest of the three grades, which is applied to "buildings of national importance and special interest".  The district is in the south west of the city of Sheffield, and covers the areas of Bradway, Dore and Totley.

For neighbouring areas, see listed buildings in S7, listed buildings in S8, listed buildings in S11, listed buildings in Dronfield, listed buildings in Grindleford and listed buildings in Holmesfield.



Buildings

References 

 - A list of all the listed buildings within Sheffield City Council's boundary is available to download from this page.

Sources

 
Sheffield